The 2005 Bulgarian Supercup was the third Bulgarian Supercup match, a football match which was contested between the "A" professional football group champion, CSKA Sofia, and the winner of Bulgarian Cup, Levski Sofia. The match was held on 31 July 2005 at the Vasil Levski National Stadium in Sofia, Bulgaria. Levski beat CSKA 4–2 (after penalties) to win their first Bulgarian Supercup.

Match details

2005
PFC CSKA Sofia matches
PFC Levski Sofia matches
Supercup
Bulgarian Supercup 2005